Deborah Bowman may refer to:

 Debbie Bowman-Sullivan (born 1963), Australian former field hockey defender
 Deborah Bowman (academic), British professor of ethics and law